The Township of Fenelon was a municipality in present-day Kawartha Lakes, Ontario, Canada. The township was named after François de Salignac de la Mothe-Fénelon (missionary) (1641–79) who was a missionary in New France, establishing a mission on the Bay of Quinte.

The community of Cambray within the township was named after Cambrai in France, where François Fénelon (1651–1715), younger brother of the missionary, was archbishop.

Communities
 Cameron
 Cambray
 Fenelon Falls
 Long Beach
 Sturgeon Point

See also
List of townships in Ontario

References

Footnotes

Bibliography

Communities in Kawartha Lakes
Former township municipalities in Ontario